Silent Night: A Christmas in Rome is a 1998 Christmas live album by Paddy Moloney and The Chieftains. Almost each track features a different female/male guest artist or a group/choir. Artists featured on this album are Maire Brennan, Montserrat Caballe, Sissel Kyrkjebø, Zucchero and Carlos Nunez.

Track listing
"Silent Night - Introduction" (Sissel Kyrkjebø)  
"Overture" (The Chieftains)  
"Hei Lassie" (The Bulgarian Voices Angelite; Elka Simeonova) 
"Journey to Bethlehem" (Monsignor Marco Frisina)  
"Mitt Hjerte Alltid Vanker" (Sissel Kyrkjebø; The Chieftains)  
"Gloria" (Monsignor Marco Frisina)  
"Oh Holy Night" (Pietro Ballo; Teatro Massimo Children's Choir) 
"Joy to the World" (Harlem Gospel Choir; Allen Bailey)  
"Lullabies" (Monsignor Marco Frisina; Paola Cecchi; Máire Brennan)  
"Don Oiche úd i Mbeithil/On that Night in Bethlehem" (The Glenstal Abbey Monks)  
"March of the Three Kings" (The Chieftains) 
"Silent Night" (Máire Brennan; Harlem Gospel Choir; Montserrat Caballé; Zucchero; Sissel Kyrkjebø; Pietro Ballo) 
"The Shepherds" (Monsignor Marco Frisina) 
"Nedeleg/A Breton Christmas Carol" (Loerou Ruz)  
"Finale Medley" (The Chieftains)

Personnel
 Pietro Ballo - vocals
 Allen Bailey - choirmaster
 Derek Bell - Irish harp, harpsichord
 Moya Brennan - vocals
 Jorj Botuha - chanter
 Montserrat Caballé - vocals
 Consort of St. Sepulcure - chorus
 Choir of the Basilica of S. Giovanni in Laterano - chorus
 Kevin Conneff - bodhrán
 Martin Fay - fiddle
 John Feeley - acoustic guitar
 Marco Frisina - conductor
 Seán Keane - fiddle
 Sissel Kyrkjebø - vocals
 Loerou Ruz - chorus
 Matt Molloy - flute
 Paddy Moloney - tin whistle, uilleann pipes
 Carlos Núñez - recorder, gaita
 Giancarlo Parisi - zampogna
 Orchestra Sinfonica della Diocesi di Roma - orchestra
 Elka Simeonova - vocals
 Fiachra Trench - harmonium, keyboards
 Valentin Velkov - choirmaster
 Preston Vismale - keyboards, piano
 Zucchero - vocals, acoustic guitar

References

1998 live albums
The Chieftains albums